Klonimir (fl. 896) was a Serbian prince of the Vlastimirović dynasty, and pretender to the throne of the Serbian Principality.  His father and uncle, co-princes Strojimir and Gojnik, had been exiled to Bulgaria with their families after their eldest brother Mutimir had ousted them and taken the Serbian throne. Klonimir married a Bulgarian noblewoman chosen by Khan Boris I himself. She later gave birth to a son named Časlav. The descendants of the three Vlastimirović branches continued the feud over the Serbian throne which spanned over the century, and Klonimir returned to Serbia in ca. 896 and attempted to take the country from his cousin Petar, who had ruled since 891. He managed to take over the Serbian city of Destinikon, but the much more powerful Petar defeated him, and it is presumed that Klonimir died in battle. His son Časlav later became the most powerful of the Vlastimirović dynasty, as Prince of Serbia from 927 to 960, unifying several tribes in the region.

Life 

The history of the early medieval Serbian Principality and the Vlastimirović dynasty (ruled ca. 610–960) is recorded in the work De Administrando Imperio (On the Governance of the Empire), compiled by the Byzantine Emperor Constantine VII Porphyrogenitus (r. 913–959).  Vlastimir, the eponymous founder of the Vlastimirović dynasty and the ruling Serbian Prince (archon) in the period of ca. 830–851, was a Byzantine ally who had managed to devastate the Bulgars in a three-year war (839–842), and greatly expand the Serbian realm to the west. Upon his death, the rule was inherited by his three sons, Mutimir, Strojimir and Gojnik, though supreme rule was held by the eldest, Mutimir. The three brothers successfully fought off a Bulgarian attack in 853 or 854 (shortly after the death of Vlastimir), when they had managed to capture 12 great boyars and the commander himself, Vladimir, the son of Khan Boris I of Bulgaria (r. 852–889). The Bulgars sought to avenge the defeat of their previous Khan, Presian. The Serbs and Bulgars then made peace, and possibly formed an alliance.

A quarrel eventually broke out between Vlastimir's three sons. Mutimir, the eldest, sought supreme leadership of the Serbian throne; as the co-ruling younger brothers, Strojimir and Gojnik, resisted, he had them captured and exiled to Bulgaria, where they were most likely held as hostages at the Bulgarian court at Pliska, after 855/856. According to V. Ćorović, Boris wanted to gain influence on these events in Serbia and sought to help those who could stand on the Bulgarian side instead of the Byzantine, and thus he graciously received the two younger brothers, holding them as weapons for his needs. Evidence of this is the fact that Boris himself chose a Bulgarian noblewoman to marry Strojimir's son, Klonimir. It seems that the exiled families were treated well in Bulgaria, with respect to their status. Mutimir had not exiled all members of his brother's families, but had retained his nephew Petar, the son of Gojnik, at the Serbian court for political reasons, although Petar later feared his father's fate and eventually escaped across the western border to Croatia. The descendants of Vlastimir's sons continued to fight for the throne over the century.  An important event was the Christianization of the Serbs which began in 870, accompanied by strong political and cultural influences from the Byzantine Empire.

After Mutimir's death in 890 or 891, the rule of Serbia was inherited by Mutimir's three sons Pribislav, Bran and Stefan (called the Mutimirović), headed by the eldest son, Pribislav. However, Pribislav's reign only lasted less than a year, ending when his cousin Petar returned to Serbia from Croatia and won a battle against Pribislav. Petar acquired the Serbian throne in ca. 892. Mutimir's three sons then left Serbia for Croatia where they sought refuge and help. In ca. 894, Bran tried to oust Petar with Croatian help but was unsuccessful; he was captured and blinded (according to political mutilation culture). In ca. 896, Klonimir left Bulgaria and marched an army into Serbia, entering the Serbian city of Destinikon (also spelled Destinika and ), with the intent of seizing the throne. This city's exact location is undetermined, as De Administrando Imperio only lists it as one of eight fortified cities (καστρα) of baptized Serbia (not counting those of the maritime Serbian principalities). Klonimir was likely supported by the Bulgarians, which shows that Petar had bad relations with Bulgaria. However, Klonimir was unsuccessful, and the powerful Petar slew him. A little while afterwards, Petar was recognized as the ruler of Serbia by Bulgarian Tsar Symeon, resulting in a twenty-year peace and alliance.

Aftermath 

Petar ruled at peace with the Bulgars, though he was probably not happy with his subordinate position, and may have dreamed of reasserting his independence. His situation and the succession wars of the three branches of Vlastimir's sons was to play a key part in the coming Bulgarian–Byzantine War.  However, according to De Administrando Imperio, Petar would have ruled under the suzerainty of Leo VI.

Klonimir's son, Časlav, was sent with Bulgarian aid to conquer Serbia in 924. The Bulgarians tricked him and annexed Serbia, until Časlav returned from exile in 927 after Symeon's death and asserted his rule over Serbia in a Byzantine alliance.

On July 11, 2006, the Serbian government bought a Byzantine-styled seal in solid gold weighing 15,64 g, most likely belonging to Strojimir (Klonimir's father), at an auction in Munich. It was presumably crafted outside Byzantium, and has a Greek inscription (KE BOIΘ CTPOHMIP, "God Help Strojimir") and a patriarchal cross in the centre. It most likely dates to the second half of the 9th century, between 855/56 and 896, when Klonimir tried to take the Serbian throne.

Annotations

References

Sources 

Primary sources
 
Secondary sources
 
 
 
 
 
 
 
 
 
 
 
 
 
 

9th-century Serbian royalty
9th-century Bulgarian people
9th-century rulers in Europe
Pretenders to the Serbian throne in the Middle Ages
Medieval Serbian princes
Vlastimirović dynasty
Murdered Serbian royalty
Serbian rebels
Serbian exiles
Eastern Orthodox Christians from Serbia
9th-century births
897 deaths
Medieval rebels
Slavic warriors